Cause and Effect is the fourth album by the Norwegian singer-songwriter Maria Mena. "Belly Up" was the first single of the album, but only released in her home country. "All This Time" was the 2nd single in Norway and the first single released in the rest of Europe. A music video for "All This Time" aired on VH1 Europe.

Track listing

Singles
 "Belly Up" (2008)
 "All This Time (Pick-Me-Up Song)" (2008)
 "I'm In Love" (2009)
 "I Was Made For Lovin' You" (2009)

Charts and certifications

Weekly charts

Year-end charts

Certifications

References

External links
 Information from CDON
 Maria Mena's Official Website

Maria Mena albums
2008 albums